Champagnat may refer to the following places in France:
 Champagnat, Creuse, in the Creuse department
 Champagnat, Saône-et-Loire, in the Saône-et-Loire department
 Champagnat-le-Jeune, in the Puy-de-Dôme department

See also
Marcellin Champagnat (1789–1840), founder of the Marist Brothers
Club Champagnat, rugby union club in Buenos Aires, Argentina
Club Champagnat, rugby union club in Montevideo, Uruguay